Customs and Excise refers to customs duty and excise duty.

In certain countries, the national tax authorities that are responsible for collecting those duties are named Customs and Excise, including:
 HM Customs and Excise, a department of the British government until 2005
 HM Revenue and Customs a department formed by the merger of HM Customs and Excise with Inland Revenue in 2005
 Customs and Excise Department (Hong Kong)
 Directorate General of Customs and Excise (Indonesia)
 In Ghana, the Customs, Excise and Preventive Service
 In Singapore, the defunct Customs and Excise Department, which was replaced by the Singapore Customs on 1 April 2003